More of Roy Orbison's Greatest Hits is a  Roy Orbison album from Monument Records recorded at the RCA Studio B in Nashville, Tennessee and released in 1964. The songs "It's Over" and "Indian Wedding" were recorded at the Fred Foster Studios also in Nashville.

Track listing

References

Albums produced by Fred Foster
Roy Orbison compilation albums
1964 greatest hits albums
Monument Records compilation albums